Nowy Świętów is a village in the administrative district of Gmina Głuchołazy, within Nysa County, Opole Voivodeship, in south-western Poland, close to the Czech border.

The village has a population of 1,000.

History
The village was first mentioned in 1300, when it was part of fragmented Piast-ruled Poland. Later on, it was also part of Bohemia (Czechia), Prussia, and Germany. During World War II, the Germans operated the E477 forced labour subcamp of the Stalag VIII-B/344 prisoner-of-war camp in the village. After Germany's defeat in the war, in 1945, the village became again part of Poland.

Transport
There is a train station in Nowy Świętów, and the Voivodeship road 411 also passes through the village.

References

Villages in Nysa County